Charmi is a name and is used as the name of places.

Charmi as a name 

 Charmi is an Indian actress.
 Shahin Charmi (born 1953) is an Iranian-born German artist.

Other uses 
Charmi may also refer to:
 Charmi, Mazandaran, Iran
 Charmi, Razavi Khorasan, Iran